Robert Gardos (born 16 January 1979 in Budapest) is a Hungarian-born Austrian table tennis player, European Champion and Olympic participant. He plays for the French club Chartres ASTT.

Since the opening in 2011, Robert Gardos practices at the Werner Schlager Academy in Schwechat, Austria.

Career

Early career
Gardos was born on 16 January 1979 in Budapest, Hungary. He began playing table tennis in his hometown club Budapesti VSC where his father, Gábor Gárdos worked as a coach. In 1993 Gardos won the European Youth Championship in singles and in mixed doubles on the side of Mihaela Encea in the cadet category. At the age of 14, he switched his residence to Austria, however, he competed for Hungary until he was 18. In 1998, after a conflict with the Hungarian national team – Gardos was left out from the team and could only compete in the singles event – he opted to play for Austria in the future, having already obtained Austrian citizenship two years earlier.

Austrian years

Gardos, who is right-handed, began competing for Austria after the three year international suspension for country changing was lifted. He had several success at Table Tennis European Championships, most notably winning the doubles event of the 2012 edition with Daniel Habesohn. One year later the duo finished second in the same event having lost the final against Wang Zeng Yi and Tan Ruiwu. In singles, Gardos' best performance came in 2008 in St. Petersburg by finishing third.

Gardos was also present at two Olympic Games in 2008 and 2012. At the 2008 Summer Olympics Gardos faced an early exit in the singles as he was beaten in the second round by Zoran Primorac, thus finished tied-33rd. In the team event, Austria (Robert Gardos, Chen Weixing, Werner Schlager) just missed out a medal as they fell short against South Korea (Oh Sang-Eun, Ryu Seung-Min, Yoon Jae-Young) in the bronze final by a scoreline 1–3.

Gardos did not qualify for the 2012 Summer Olympics in singles, but the Austrian team with the same line-up was present at the Games. After an easy victory in the first round (Egypt, 3–0), the team faced eventual bronze medalist Germany and lost without winning a single match (0–3), thus finishing tied-fifth.

In June 2015, he competed in the inaugural European Games, for Austria in table tennis, more specifically, Men's team with Stefan Fegerl and Daniel Habesohn. He earned a bronze medal.

Gardos qualified for and competed in the 2017 World Table Tennis Championships, seeded at number 42. In the first round, he defeated Chew Zhe Yu of Singapore (4-2), before losing to Chinese player, and number 4 seed Zhang Jike, (2-4).

Personal life
His nickname is Robi. His hobbies include playing golf, reading, and listening to music. He speaks German, Hungarian, Spanish, and English.

Style
Robert Gardos uses the following styles for play:
 Offensive
 Fast
 Topspin
 Backhand orientation

References

External links

 
 
 
 

1979 births
Living people
Hungarian male table tennis players
Olympic table tennis players of Austria
Table tennis players at the 2008 Summer Olympics
Table tennis players at the 2012 Summer Olympics
Table tennis players at the 2016 Summer Olympics
Table tennis players at the 2015 European Games
European Games bronze medalists for Austria
Table tennis players from Budapest
Austrian people of Hungarian descent
Naturalised citizens of Austria
European Games medalists in table tennis
Table tennis players at the 2019 European Games
Table tennis players at the 2020 Summer Olympics
Austrian male table tennis players